Katalin Berek (7 October 1930 – 26 February 2017), also known as Kati, was a Hungarian actress. She appeared in more than 40 films and television shows between 1950 and 2001. She starred in the 1975 film Adoption, which won the Golden Bear at the 25th Berlin International Film Festival.

Selected filmography
 A Glass of Beer (1955)
 The Upthrown Stone (1969)
 Adoption (1975)

References

External links

1930 births
2017 deaths
Hungarian film actresses
20th-century Hungarian actresses
People from Makó